Susan Sandler is an American writer and currently a professor at New York University's Tisch School of the Arts. She has numerous writing credits but is probably best known for her play Crossing Delancey, which she also adapted into a film with the same name starring Amy Irving and directed by Joan Micklin Silver.

Screenplays/Teleplays
Crossing Delancey (based on her original play)
Friends at Last (starring Kathleen Turner) - CBS
Love Invents Us (based on the novel by Amy Bloom) - Sarah Green Productions
The Florence Greenberg Story (starring Bette Midler) - TNT
A Lesson in Love - Grossbart-Barnett
Flying in Peace - Columbia Pictures Television
Cost of Living - Hallmark Channel
Lonelyville - Columbia Pictures
I Slept for Science - Scott Rudin Productions
Glitter Girls - Jersey Films
Too Many Cooks - Interscope
Funny That Way - Nantucket Film Festival

Plays
Crossing Delancey
Under the Bed - premiered at The Caldwell Theatre
The Renovation - (Actors Theatre of Louisville)

Off Broadway
The Moaner - directed by Dennie Gordon
Kinfolks and Mountain Music - based on the stories of Gurney Norman
Tots - Ensemble Studio Theatre (Sandler also directed)

References

External links
Sandler's NYU biography

American dramatists and playwrights
American essayists
Screenwriters from New York (state)
Jewish women writers
Living people
Tisch School of the Arts faculty
Writers from New York City
American women essayists
American women screenwriters
Jewish American dramatists and playwrights
American women dramatists and playwrights
Writers from New York (state)
Year of birth missing (living people)